Samuel James Burris (July 21, 1919 – June 19, 1982), nicknamed "Speed", was an American Negro league pitcher in the 1940s.

A native of Centralia, Illinois, Burris played for the Birmingham Black Barons in 1940. In four recorded appearances on the mound, he posted a 4.82 ERA over 9.1 innings. Burris died in 1982 at age 62.

References

External links
 and Seamheads

1919 births
1982 deaths
Place of death missing
Birmingham Black Barons players
Baseball pitchers
Baseball players from Illinois
People from Centralia, Illinois
20th-century African-American sportspeople